Laura Jordan (born April 10, 1977) is a Canadian actress.

Biography
Born in Toronto, Ontario, Canada, Jordan lived in France for three years where she studied French at the University of Paris. She moved from Toronto to Los Angeles on a whim with her best friend & fellow actor, Malin Åkerman in 2002.

Jordan played Sadie in the 2005 film Berkeley. In 2008, she played Kayla Scott in Joy Ride 2: Dead Ahead, a sequel to Joy Ride (2001). Jordan played Madeline Maguire on the 2009 TV series Shattered.

She plays in a band called The Billionaires based out of Los Angeles.

Filmography

References

External links
 

1977 births
Actresses from Toronto
Canadian film actresses
Canadian television actresses
Living people